St Helen & St Katharine is a private girls' day school, located in Abingdon, Oxfordshire.

History 
St Helen's School, Abingdon was founded in 1903 by the Community of St Mary the Virgin (CSMV) to provide a Christian education for girls.  St Katharine's School, in Wantage, is named after St Catherine of Alexandria, although spelled with a "K". The schools merged in 1938 to create St Helen & St Katharine.

The present school 
St Helen & St Katharine is an independent day school for girls located on the outskirts of Abingdon. An extensive network of school buses, which St Helen & St Katharine shares with Abingdon School, brings pupils to the school from across Oxfordshire, Berkshire and surrounding counties. 700 pupils, aged 9 to 18, study in a campus of Edwardian and modern buildings, set in 22 acres. 

Admission is at ages 9+, 10+, 11+, 13+ and 16+. An entrance examination is held in January for 9+, 10+ and 11+ and in November for 13+ for admission in the following September.  Girls are accepted into the Sixth Form on the basis of their GCSE results and an interview. There may be occasional vacancies in other years of the school.

Scholarships are awarded by the Head to recognise excellence, ability and potential and include academic, music, art, drama, sport and all-rounder scholarships.  Academic scholarships are valued at 10% of fees, music scholarships provide free tuition in one / two instruments and all other scholarships are valued at £300 pa. All scholarships are open to internal and external candidates.  Bursaries of up to 100% of the fees are available to pupils from Year 7 and are based on means-tested assessments of financial circumstances.

Close links with Abingdon School add a co-educational dimension, with some joint sixth form teaching and collaboration in other activities, including a school bus service and joint Critical Thinking course taken by all Lower Sixth pupils. The close relationship between the two schools enables music, drama and debating as well as many social events to take place together.

Buildings
The original school building dates from 1906. In recent years an extensive building programme has been undertaken. Most recent developments include a Performing Arts Centre; Sports Centre with fitness suite; a library facility which includes ICT Suites, lecture theatre and careers library which opened in 2010; a refurbished and extended Sixth Form Centre (2011) and new kitchen and dining facilities (2012). In September 2014 a Science Centre with 12 laboratories and a three-storey glass atrium event space was added.  A sports centre with rowing suite, indoor cycle studio and fitness gym were added in 2016.

Curriculum
The curriculum includes the following subjects: Art, Biology, Business Studies, Ceramics, Chemistry, Classics, Computing, Design Technology, Drama and Theatre Studies, Economics, English Language, English Literature, Food Studies, French, Geography, German, Government and Politics, Greek, History, Latin, Mandarin, Mathematics, Further Mathematics, Music, Physical Education, Physics, Pottery, Psychology, Religious Studies, and Spanish. The school has its own Chapel in which a weekly Eucharist is offered to staff and girls.

Life beyond the classroom is full and it is this combination which embodies the ethos of the School.

Sport
Major sports include lacrosse, netball, athletics, tennis, cross country, gymnastics and rounders. A wide range of recreational sports clubs is also available including badminton, basketball, cricket, fencing, gymnastics, swimming and sailing.

Music and drama
Tuition is provided in all major instruments including the harp and organ and over 400 individual music lessons take place each week.

Clubs and societies
Over 100 clubs, societies and groups are on offer. Of particular note are Debating and Public Speaking, The Duke of Edinburgh's Award Scheme and Young Enterprise Programme, which all enjoy a strong tradition in the school.

St Kate's Day celebrations
The school celebrates St Katharine's Day, which it describes as ’St Kate's Day’, in November each year. In the morning there is a Eucharist, followed by events to raise money for the school's chosen charities. A highlight of the day is the lunchtime lacrosse fixture between St Helen's and the boys of Abingdon School's Rugby First XV.

Alumnae

 Mary Allen, former Chief Executive of the Royal Opera House
 Hatti Archer, (nee Hatti Dean) athlete
 Veronica Ashworth, RAF officer and nurse
 Samantha Cameron, businesswoman and wife of former British Prime Minister David Cameron
 Jennie Formby, senior official in the Unite trade union and General Secretary of the Labour Party
 Elspeth Hanson, violinist with "Bond"
 Anne Mueller, civil servant and academic
 Lindsey Russell, Blue Peter Presenter
 Alice Thomson, Leader Writer, The Times
 Jane Tranter, Head, BBC Worldwide Productions

References

External links 
St Helen and St Katharine Website
Profile on the Independent Schools Council website
2013 independent schools Inspectorate Inspection report 2013 
 The SHSK Society (Alumnae)

Abingdon-on-Thames
Girls' schools in Oxfordshire
Private schools in Oxfordshire

Member schools of the Girls' Schools Association
Educational institutions established in 1938
1938 establishments in England
Church of England private schools in the Diocese of Oxford